Alina Vladimirovna Jidkova (born 18 January 1977) is a former professional tennis player from Russia. In her career, she won one WTA doubles title, at the 2005 Mexican Open and reached the finals three other times, at the Memphis Open 2003, Québec 2006 and Cincinnati Masters 2007. She also won nine singles and nine doubles titles on the ITF Circuit. In March 2005, she reached her best singles ranking of world No. 51, while in August 2003, she peaked at No. 50 in the doubles rankings.

Early life
Alinka, as is her nickname, was born in Moscow, then capital of the Soviet Union, to Vladimir, an engineer and a former professional weight lifter, and Lina, a school teacher and a former 100 meter sprinter. She has one brother, Dmitriy, former boxer, who now owns a construction business. She spent her early years in the Spartak Moscow tennis Club, but later she moved to the United States and attended Nick Bollettieri's tennis academy in Florida.

Tennis career
In 2004, she reached the quarterfinals of Generali Ladies Linz after beating Serena Williams in straight sets. Aside from Williams, she has career victories against Jelena Jankovic, Mary Pierce, Samantha Stosur, Alicia Molik, Chanda Rubin, Amanda Coetzer, Brenda Schultz-McCarthy, Amy Frazier, Petra Martic and other notable players. In 2005, she won her single WTA Tour event, the Mexican Open doubles title in Acapulco, partnering with Tatiana Perebiynis. She has also finished runner-up on three occasions.

Jidkova underwent knee surgery on 3 April 2001 for torn meniscus suffered during practice after Miami, returning to action in late April.

Retirement and coaching career
She retired from professional tennis at the end of the 2010 season. Her last official singles match played was against Monica Puig, 2016 Olympic champion. Later she worked as a coach for Galina Voskoboeva, Ksenia Pervak and Kaia Kanepi. As a coach Alina Jidkova reached with Kaia Kanepi the Quarter-Final of the US-Open in 2017.

Personal life
Jidkova resides in Boca Raton, Florida, and is married to entrepreneur Sascha Ghods. The two married on 18 December 2010 in a ceremony in Vienna, Austria.

WTA career finals

Doubles: 4 (1 title, 3 runner-ups)

ITF finals

Singles: 17 (9–8)

Doubles: 30 (9–21)

References

External links
 
 

1977 births
Living people
Sportspeople from Boca Raton, Florida
Tennis players from Moscow
Russian expatriates in the United States
Russian female tennis players